Yellow flag may refer to:

Iris pseudacorus, an aquatic flowering plant
A flag of a yellow colour:
Yellow flag (contagion), historically displayed on ships to indicate the presence of disease or quarantine (obsolete); also used in some cities to mark a recent death in a neighborhood, regardless of cause
Racing flags, used in motor sports to indicate hazardous conditions
Penalty flag, used in various sports including American football
Yellow Flag Line, transport on the Chao Phraya River, with service indicated by the flag color
 Yellow Dragon Flag, the flag of the Qing dynasty
The Yellow Flag, 1937 German drama film
 Yellow Banners of the Eight Banner system
 Plain Yellow Banner
 Bordered Yellow Banner

Flag, yellow